The Point Pleasant Formation is a geologic formation in Ohio. It dates back to the Middle Ordovician.

References
 Generalized Stratigraphic Chart for Ohio

Ordovician System of North America
Ordovician Ohio
Middle Ordovician Series